Behind the Banana Curtain is a compilation album released by Australian radio station 4ZZZ. It is a 2 disc set that documents 25 years of 4ZZZ broadcasting and their contribution to Brisbane's music scene

Track listing

Disc One

(I'm) Stranded – The Saints
Karen – The Go-Betweens
Task Force – Razar
Cigarettes and Alcohol – The Leftovers
Sunset Strip – The Riptides
Help – The Apartments
Savage – The Fun Things
Crazy Eddie – Xero
Brisbane Blacks – Mop and the Dropouts
Buzzsaw Popstar – The Vampire Lovers
Black Banned – Mystery of Sixes
Blue Shirt – The Colours
Igloo – The Screaming Tribesmen
Alice D – Lovs e Blur
Summer Vacation – Presidents Eleven
Pig City – The Parameters
SEQEB Scabs – La Fetts
Winter Moving In – Post No Bills
The Living Kind – Ups and Downs
Too Much Acid – Pineapples from the Dawn of Time
Cyclone Hits Expo – Choo Dikka Dikka
Death Row Road – Hotel Breslin

Disc Two

Harold & Maude – Batswing Saloon
Another World – Purple Avengers
Chill Out America – Chopper Division
Creatures Downstairs – Girly
Dreamkillers – Dreamkillers
 Boy's Germs – Gravel Rash
V8 Rock 'n' Roll – Blowhard
Children – Acid World
Treat Yourself Gently – Isis
Fantastic Plastic – Custard
Dreaming – Wishing Chair
I Believe – Toothfaeries
Mudpool Goddess – Blood Party
Drew Romance – The Melniks
Dart – Screamfeeder
Fish and Chip Bitch from Ipswich – Escape from Toytown
The Day You Come – Powderfinger
Not From There – Sich Offnen
I Wanna Be a Nudist – Regurgitator

See also

Brisbane punk rock
The Cane Toad Times
Pig City music festival and symposium
Street Arts Community Theatre Company

References

2000 compilation albums
Compilation albums by Australian artists